John Jamieson (born 19 February 1944) is a Scottish footballer, who played for Berwick Rangers, Albion Rovers, Dumbarton, Stenhousemuir and Hamilton Academical.

After leaving Hamilton, Jamieson managed junior club Shotts Bon Accord.

References

1944 births
Scottish footballers
Dumbarton F.C. players
Berwick Rangers F.C. players
Albion Rovers F.C. players
Stenhousemuir F.C. players
Hamilton Academical F.C. players
Scottish Football League players
Living people
Association football midfielders
Scottish football managers